Arizola is a populated place situated in Pinal County, Arizona, United States.

The community was named by combining Arizona and Ola Thomas, the daughter of an early settler.

History
Arizola's population was 20 in the 1960 census.

References

Populated places in Pinal County, Arizona
Populated places in the Sonoran Desert